Soochow University or Suzhou University may refer to:

Soochow University (1900–1952), a university in Suzhou (Soochow), Jiangsu, China
Soochow University (Taiwan) (1951–present), a university in Taipei, Taiwan, founded by faculty from the former Soochow University
Soochow University (Suzhou) (1982–present), a university in Suzhou, Jiangsu, China
Suzhou University (Anhui) (1949–present), a university in Suzhou, Anhui, China